Abdo al Tallawi was a Syrian general who was killed in 2011 in the Siege of Homs during the course of the Syrian civil war. His two sons and nephew were also killed during the fighting.

References 

2011 deaths
Syrian generals
Year of birth missing
Syrian military personnel killed in action
Military personnel killed in the Syrian civil war